Events in the year 1872 in Brazil.

Incumbents
Monarch – Pedro II
Prime Minister – Viscount of Rio Branco

Events
 Brazil held its first nationwide census in 1872, having a recorded population of 10 million.

Births

Deaths

References

 
1870s in Brazil
Years of the 19th century in Brazil
Brazil
Brazil